Flint is an unincorporated community located in Mitchell County, Georgia, United States.

History
The community was named after the Flint River. An early variant name was "Cochrans Mill".

Geography
Flint's latitude is at 31.317 and its longitude is at -84.179. Its elevation rests at 184 feet. Flint appears on the Baconton South U.S. Geological Survey Map and lies at the intersection of U.S. 19 and Tution Road. Flint Road, River Road, and Saint Mary's Road also lie in the area.

References

Unincorporated communities in Mitchell County, Georgia
Unincorporated communities in Georgia (U.S. state)